Mohamed Bajeddoub (born 1945 in Safi, Morocco) is an acclaimed Moroccan artist of the traditional Andalusian music.

As a youngster he regularly attended Sufi ceremonials in Sheikh Abu Mohammed Salih where they used to sing the al-Burda in Choirs. Aged 15, he studied under Sidi Said al-Qadiri in Salé and Mohamed Tbayek in Marrakesh. In Salé he progressively attracted interest and relative fame, and eventually achieved a status nationwide.

He has a distinctive style that is considered modern in comparison to more traditional Andalusian artists such as Mohammed Loukili, and sings in a tenor voice.

References

1945 births
Living people
People from Safi, Morocco
20th-century Moroccan male singers